Dobbs v. Jackson Women's Health Organization, is a landmark decision of the U.S. Supreme Court in which the court held that the Constitution of the United States does not confer a right to abortion. The court's decision overruled both Roe v. Wade (1973) and Planned Parenthood v. Casey (1992), giving individual states the full power to regulate any aspect of abortion not protected by federal law.

The case concerned the constitutionality of a 2018 Mississippi state law that banned most abortion operations after the first 15 weeks of pregnancy. The Mississippi law was based on a model by a Christian legal organization, Alliance Defending Freedom, with the specific intent to provoke a legal battle leading to the overturning of Roe. Jackson Women's Health Organization—Mississippi's only abortion clinic—had sued Thomas E. Dobbs, state health officer with the Mississippi State Department of Health, in March 2018. Lower courts had prevented enforcement of the law with preliminary injunctions. The injunctions were based on the ruling in Planned Parenthood v. Casey, which had prevented states from banning abortion before fetal viability, generally within the first 24 weeks, on the basis that a woman's choice for abortion during that time is protected by the Due Process Clause of the Fourteenth Amendment to the U.S. Constitution.

The ideological shift of the Supreme Court during the Trump administration that culminated with the 2020 appointment of Justice Amy Coney Barrett made Dobbs a potential vehicle for social conservatives to challenge Roe. Several states passed legislation—including trigger laws—to strictly regulate abortion should the newly conservative court overturn Roe. Dobbs gained more attention in the wake of legal battles over the Texas Heartbeat Act, enacted in May 2021, leading to near record-setting amicus curiae submissions. Oral arguments before the Supreme Court were held in December 2021. In May 2022, Politico published a leaked draft majority opinion by Justice Samuel Alito, which prompted more states to pass trigger laws; the leaked draft largely matched the final decision.

On June 24, 2022, the Court issued a decision that, by a vote of 6–3, reversed the lower court rulings. A smaller majority of five justices joined the opinion overturning Roe and Casey. The majority held that abortion is not a constitutional right as the Constitution does not mention it and its substantive right was not "deeply rooted" in the country's history, meaning that individual states have the authority to regulate access to abortion. Chief Justice John Roberts agreed with the judgment upholding the Mississippi law but did not join the majority in the opinion to overturn Roe and Casey.

Leading Republican politicians supported the decision, while leading Democrats and many international observers criticized it. Protests and counterprotests over the decision occurred in many U.S. cities and internationally, with most polling indicating at the time of the decision that 55% to 60% of the public disapproved of overturning Roe.

Background 

The U.S. Supreme Court ruled in Roe v. Wade, a 1973 landmark decision, that a right to privacy within the scope of the Fourteenth Amendment to the U.S. Constitution included a woman's qualified right to terminate her pregnancy. The Court partly reaffirmed this in Planned Parenthood v. Casey, a 1992 case that also struck down Roes pregnancy trimester framework in favor of a fetal viability standard, typically 23 or 24 weeks into pregnancy. Casey held that laws that restrict abortion before the fetus is viable and laws that create an undue burden on women seeking abortions that place a "substantial obstacle" are unconstitutional under the Due Process Clause given a woman's right to "substantive due process" under the Fourteenth Amendment. The Court also ruled that this right is not absolute, must be balanced with possible government interest, and may be affected by medical advancements that allow premature babies to survive at younger gestational ages.

After Roe, there was a national political realignment surrounding abortion. The abortion-rights movement in the United States initially emphasized the national policy benefits of abortion, such as smaller welfare expenses, slower population growth, and fewer illegitimate births. The abortion-rights movement drew support from the population control movement, feminists, and environmentalists. Anti-abortion advocates and civil-rights activists accused abortion-rights supporters of intending to control the population of racial minorities and the disabled, citing their ties to racial segregationists and eugenicist legal reformers. The abortion-rights movement subsequently distanced itself from the population control movement and took up choice-based and rights-oriented rhetoric similar to what was used in the Roe decision.

At the time of Roe, opposition to abortion was largely concentrated in the Catholic Church, with many Protestant faiths leaning in favor of or not taking a stance on it. Catholics and many Northern Democratic politicians supported an expansive welfare state, wanted to reduce rates of abortion through prenatal insurance and federally funded day care, and opposed abortion. Beginning in the late 1970s, the anti-abortion movement in the United States shifted to Protestant faiths that saw abortion rights as part of a liberal agenda to fight against, and became part of the new Christian right. The Protestant influence helped make opposition to abortion part of the Republican Party's platform by the 1990s. Republican-led states enacted laws to restrict abortion, including abortions earlier than Caseys general standard of 24 weeks. The courts enjoined most of these laws. Fetal viability's usage as a standard was questioned in U.S. abortion-related cases after Casey, including by Justice Sandra Day O'Connor in her dissenting opinion in City of Akron v. Akron Center for Reproductive Health. These opinions argued that other scientific, philosophical, and moral considerations are involved.

During the Roberts Court since 2005, there had generally been a 5–4 conservative majority with the potential to overturn Roe and Casey. But one of those conservatives, Anthony Kennedy, had been part of the controlling plurality opinion in Casey and was generally seen as a safe vote to uphold it. Among the other conservative members were Samuel Alito, who had sat as a circuit judge on the three-judge appellate panel and dissented from the court's invalidation of the spousal notification in Casey; and Clarence Thomas, who believed the court's use of substantive due process to confer implicit rights, including a right to abortion, was incorrect. Chief Justice John Roberts was also considered part of the conservative majority, but he was a strong proponent of stare decisis, believing that even some wrongly decided cases should not be overturned, and a staunch defender of the Court's reputation.

In 2016, Senate Republicans led by majority leader Mitch McConnell prevented then-President Barack Obama from filling the vacancy left by the death of Justice Antonin Scalia. This allowed President Donald Trump to fill the vacancy with Justice Neil Gorsuch the following year, and initiated the ideological shift of the court with respect to abortion rights. The court appeared to shift further in 2018, when Kennedy retired and was replaced by Brett Kavanaugh, a known Casey opponent. Because of Roberts's stated positions, he was considered the "swing vote" in abortion cases, but his strong support for upholding even wrongly decided cases would make it difficult for Roe or Casey to be challenged. Nevertheless, several Republican-majority states passed bills restricting abortion, anticipating a potential shift in the Supreme Court and providing possible case vehicles for bringing the issue to it. When Amy Coney Barrett replaced Ruth Bader Ginsburg in late 2020, the Court's ideological makeup shifted further, creating a 6–3 conservative majority and providing an opportunity to additionally limit or even overturn Roe and Casey by moving Roberts out of the "swing vote" role. Ginsburg had generally been in the majority of past Supreme Court cases that enjoined stricter abortion laws. Conversely, Barrett held anti-abortion views; in 1998, she wrote in a law journal article that abortion is "always immoral".

Gestational Age Act 

In March 2018, the Mississippi Legislature passed the Gestational Age Act, which banned any abortion operation after the first 15 weeks of pregnancy, with exceptions for a medical emergency or severe fetal abnormality but none for cases of rape or incest. The medical emergency exception allows abortions to save the life of a pregnant woman and in situations where "the continuation of the pregnancy will create a serious risk of substantial and irreversible impairment of a major bodily function". The severe fetal abnormality exception allows abortions of fetuses whose defects will leave them incapable of living outside the womb.

The legislature justified this prohibition on the basis that abortions for nontherapeutic or elective reasons were "a barbaric practice, dangerous for the maternal patient, and demeaning to the medical profession". Another basis was that the abortion procedures forbidden under the Act were said by the legislature to carry "significant physical and psychological risks", and could cause various medical complications.

The legislation was based on a model written by Alliance Defending Freedom, a Christian conservative legal organization. The model legislation was created with the intent to make it law in the states within the traditionally conservative Fifth Circuit Court of Appeals (Louisiana, Mississippi, and Texas), and a means to bring abortion rights to the Supreme Court. Governor Phil Bryant signed the bill into law, saying he was "committed to making Mississippi the safest place in America for an unborn child, and this bill will help us achieve that goal". He added, "We'll probably be sued here in about a half hour, and that'll be fine with me. It is worth fighting over."

Lower courts 
Within a day of the Gestational Age Act's passage, Mississippi's only abortion clinic, Jackson Women's Health Organization, and one of its doctors, Sacheen Carr-Ellis, sued state officials Thomas E. Dobbs, state health officer with the Mississippi State Department of Health, and Kenneth Cleveland, executive director of the Mississippi State Board of Medical Licensure, to challenge the Act's constitutionality. The clinic performed surgical abortions up to 16 weeks' gestation and was represented in court by the Center for Reproductive Rights. The case was heard by Judge Carlton W. Reeves of the U.S. District Court for the Southern District of Mississippi. In November 2018, Reeves ruled for the clinic and placed an injunction on Mississippi enjoining it from enforcing the Act. Reeves wrote that, based on evidence that viability of the fetus begins between 23 and 24 weeks, Mississippi had "no legitimate state interest strong enough, prior to viability, to justify a ban on abortions". Dobbs sought to have the judges consider whether fetal pain might be possible after 15 weeks, but the District Court ruled his evidence as "inadmissible and irrelevant".

The state appealed to the Fifth Circuit, which upheld Reeves's ruling in a 3–0 decision in December 2019. Senior Circuit Judge Patrick Higginbotham wrote for the Court, "In an unbroken line dating to Roe v. Wade, the Supreme Court's abortion cases have established (and affirmed, and re-affirmed) a woman's right to choose an abortion before viability. States may regulate abortion procedures prior to viability so long as they do not impose an undue burden on the woman's right, but they may not ban abortions." A request for an en banc rehearing was denied.

In May 2019, the District Court for the Southern District of Mississippi issued another injunction, this time against a newly passed Mississippi abortion law. This was a heartbeat bill that forbade most abortions when a fetus' heartbeat could be detected, which is usually from six to 12 weeks into pregnancy. In a February 2020 per curiam decision, the Fifth Circuit also upheld the second injunction. The Fifth Circuit's statements for both injunctions were similar because they both cited the lack of fetal viability during earlier stages of gestation as a reason to enjoin the laws.

Supreme Court 

Mississippi petitioned its appeal of the Fifth Circuit decisions to the Supreme Court in June 2020. Its petition, filed by Mississippi Attorney General Lynn Fitch, focused on three questions from the appeals process. In its petition, Mississippi asked the Court to revisit the viability standard on the basis of the standard's inflexibility, and inadequate accommodation of present understandings of life before birth. The filing stated that fetuses can detect pain and respond to it at 10–12 weeks gestational age, and asked the Court to allow the prohibition of "inhumane procedures". The petition also contended that the viability standard inadequately addresses the protection of potential human life. Mississippi considered this a State interest from the "onset of the pregnancy" onward.

A response brief, which focused on two questions asked in opposition to the petition, was filed by Hillary Schneller from the Center for Reproductive Rights on behalf of Jackson Women's Health Organization (JWHO). JWHO asked the Court to deny Mississippi's petition due to judicial precedent. The brief said that both the District Court and the Fifth Circuit found the Mississippi law unconstitutional by properly applying precedent in a manner that did not conflict with other courts' decisions, and argued that there was therefore nothing about the case that "warrants this Court's intervention". The brief also argued that Mississippi was misinterpreting its role in abortion regulation. While the state thought that its interest was greater than the individual right to abortion, JWHO argued that Mississippi's vested interest in regulating abortion was insufficient to ban it before viability, making the Gestational Age Act "unconstitutional by any measure".

The petition went through review at more than a dozen conferences for the Court, which is unusual for most cases. The Court granted the petition for a writ of certiorari on May 17, 2021, limiting the Court's review to a single question, "Whether all pre-viability prohibitions on elective abortions are unconstitutional." Over 140 amici curiae briefs were submitted before oral argument in Dobbs, approaching the record set by Obergefell v. Hodges, in part to separate and concurrent lawsuits filed over the Texas Heartbeat Act, which effectively gave citizens of the state the means to enforce abortion bans through civil suits.

Oral argument 
The case was heard on December 1, 2021. During the oral arguments, Mississippi was represented by Scott G. Stewart, a state solicitor general, and argued that the U.S. Constitution does not directly guarantee a right to abortion. Because of this, he said that laws about abortion should be evaluated on a rational basis review instead of the higher level of scrutiny required by the undue burden standard. Stewart also argued for overturning Roe and Casey on the basis that the decisions were unworkable and that new facts had come to light since they were made. He argued that scientific knowledge had grown about "what we know the child is doing and looks like", and claimed that we now know that fetuses are "fully human" even "very early" in gestation. Stewart also defended Mississippi's claim in its briefs that new medical advances with viability were at odds with past assumptions made when formulating the viability line, and claimed that the understanding of when fetuses begin to feel pain had grown. He maintained that because of Roe and Casey, the government could not respond to these facts by prohibiting pre-viability abortions.

JWHO, represented by Julie Rikelman (who argued the last abortion case before the Court, June Medical Services, LLC v. Russo), argued that the Court should not overrule the two decisions, because the viability standard was correct. According to Rikelman, Mississippi's arguments against Roe were not new, but instead were similar to the ones Pennsylvania made during Casey. Since Roes essential holding was upheld for Casey, she said that the Court should do the same here, since there had been no new changes in the laws and facts since then that could justify changing the Court's position. Rikelman argued that Mississippi's argument against using the undue burden standard was wrong because the standard actually specifically applies to post-viability abortion regulations rather than to the prohibition of abortions before viability. She told the Court that the undue burden standard was workable and that the viability line incorporated into the standard was likewise workable. She said that for 50 years the viability line had been clearly and consistently applied in the courts.

Elizabeth Barchas Prelogar, the U.S. Solicitor General, argued that Roe and Casey should not be overruled. She argued that there has been a substantial reliance on the right to abortion by both individuals and society, and that the Court "has never revoked a right that is so fundamental to so many Americans and so central to their ability to participate fully and equally in society."

Based on their analysis of the questioning, Court observers said that its six conservative members were likely to uphold Mississippi's law. Chief Justice John Roberts appeared to suggest that viability was not relevant to the holdings of either Roe or Casey, and that only a fair choice or opportunity to seek an abortion was constitutionally protected. The other conservative justices appeared to be ready to overturn Roe and Casey.

Leaked draft opinion 

On May 2, 2022, Politico released a draft of a majority opinion by Justice Samuel Alito circulated among the justices in February 2022. Alito's draft called the Roe decision "egregiously wrong from the start", arguing that abortion is not listed in the Constitution as a protected right, and instead allowed states to legislate abortion restrictions or guarantees under the Tenth Amendment to the U.S. Constitution. A New York Times article compared the sources Alito cited in the draft with information provided by historians and shed some light on the history of abortion in the United States.

Sources told Politico that Justices Thomas, Gorsuch, Kavanaugh, and Barrett had voted in conference with Alito in December and their positions had remained unchanged as of May 2022, though it was unclear whether they agreed with Alito's draft, as no other drafts in concurrence or dissent had yet been circulated. According to CNN, Chief Justice Roberts voted to uphold the Gestational Age Act but "did not want to completely overturn Roe v. Wade". The Washington Post reported from court sources that Roberts had been working since December 2021 on his own opinion, which would uphold Roe while narrowly allowing the Mississippi law to take effect. He had been trying to convince conservative justices in the then tentative majority to join his more moderate opinion, but the leak doomed that effort, according to sources familiar with communications between the justices.

The Supreme Court confirmed the draft's authenticity the next day; at the same time, the Supreme Court's press release said that "it does not represent a decision by the Court or the final position of any member on the issues in the case". Roberts said that he had directed the Marshal of the United States Supreme Court, Gail A. Curley, to investigate the news leak and that "to the extent this betrayal of the confidences of the Court was to undermine the integrity of our operations, it will not succeed."' CNN reported on May 31 that law clerks were asked to provide private cell phone records and sign affidavits. The unprecedented move has alarmed some clerks into exploring whether to hire independent counsel. The Supreme Court announced on January 19, 2023, that its forensic investigation could not determine the person responsible by a preponderance of the evidence. Curley said that her team formally interviewed 97 Supreme Court employees under affidavit and spoke to each of the justices. She found that at least 90 people had access to the draft decision, but none of the leads provided sufficient evidence to name an individual responsible for the leak. 

In response to the leak, Roberts said, "The work of the Court will not be affected in any way." At an Eleventh Circuit judicial conference, he called the leak "absolutely appalling" and said that "one bad apple" should not change "people's perception" of the Supreme Court; Thomas commented that the Court should not be "bullied" into delivering preferred outcomes and repeated his criticisms of stare decisis. He later added that the leak was an "unthinkable breach of trust" that "fundamentally" changed the Court.

Leaks about Supreme Court deliberations in a pending case are rare, and a leak of a draft decision is unprecedented. There is uncertainty about whether the leak violated federal laws, and experts differ as to whether the U.S. Department of Justice is likely to pursue criminal charges.

Reactions 

Within hours of the news of the leak, both pro-abortion rights protesters and anti-abortion counterprotesters gathered outside the Supreme Court building in Washington, D.C., and elsewhere in the U.S. The response to the draft put unusual public pressure on the Court as it made its decision in the case. While over 450 large-scale marches and protests organized by Planned Parenthood, Women's March, and other groups under the name "Bans Off Our Bodies" were planned for 2022, the organizers pushed the event up to May 14, 2022, after the opinion leaked. The organizers said, "Folks are mobilizing because they see that the hour is later than we thought", and that the event would lead off a "summer of rage" if Roe and Casey were overturned. A leaked Department of Homeland Security (DHS) memo indicated that DHS was preparing for a surge of political violence on public officials, clergy, and abortion providers after the ruling. A DHS bulletin warned that the leak had spawned further violence in the summer before the 2022 midterms. A number of isolated attacks on crisis pregnancy centers were reported in May and June 2022 after the leak.

Nonviolent protests were held outside some of the justices' homes, leading the U.S. Senate to unanimously pass a bill that would expand protections for the justices and their families. The bill stalled in the U.S. House of Representatives before being passed on June 14 and signed into law by President Joe Biden on June 16. Republicans have argued that those protests violate a 1950 federal law that criminalizes attempting to influence a judge in the course of their official duties by demonstrating near their residence. A man from California was arrested for attempted murder regarding an alleged assassination plot targeting Kavanaugh near his home over the leak and a pending decision in a gun control case, New York State Rifle & Pistol Association, Inc. v. Bruen. Protests continued outside the homes of some of the justices after the final decision, leading the Supreme Court marshall Gail Curley to ask officials in the District of Columbia, Maryland, and Virginia to take steps to remove the protesters under state and local laws.

The leak elicited outrage from high-ranking members of both major political parties, Democrats for the content of the draft, and Republicans out of concern for how the leak occurred. The leak renewed calls from Democrats, including Biden and pro-abortion rights activists, for the Senate to pass the Women's Health Protection Act, which had already passed the House of Representatives, to codify the rights established by Roe and Casey before Dobbs was decided and supersede the Religious Freedom Restoration Act. It failed to pass in the Senate on May 11, after a 49–51 vote primarily along party lines. Biden denounced the draft opinion as "radical" and said that same-sex marriage and birth control were also at risk.

Republicans immediately condemned the leak and called on the Supreme Court and Department of Justice, including the FBI, to launch an investigation. Twenty-two members of Congress signed a letter asking the U.S. Attorney General and FBI director to investigate. House Republican leadership issued a joint statement that called the leak "a clearly coordinated campaign to intimidate and obstruct the Justices".

In May 2022, the Marquette University Law School released a poll showing a drastic change of public opinion of the Supreme Court. In March 2022, when the survey was last conducted, 54% of respondents said they approved of the nine justices and 45% said they disapproved. In the newest survey, only 44% of respondents reported approval. In June 2022, a Gallup poll showed confidence in the Supreme Court at 25%, down from 36% in 2021, and the lowest in 50 years.

A November 2022 New York Times article investigated a possible earlier leak from the Supreme Court a few weeks before the 2014 decision Burwell v. Hobby Lobby Stores, Inc., a landmark case that allowed religious organizations to exempt themselves from having to pay for insurance-based contraceptives for their employees. The report was based on information from Rob Schenck, who said that after having dinner with Alito, he was told of the pending decision by a third party, allowing him to prepare Hobby Lobby and other religious groups when the decision was announced. Before talking to the Times about it, Schenck wrote to Chief Justice Roberts after the Dobbs leak was revealed to share what he knew of it. Alito denied having leaked the decision. The report of this earlier leak led members of the House and Senate Judiciary Committees to consider an investigation into both leaks. In a letter responding to an inquiry from Senator Sheldon Whitehouse and Representative Hank Johnson, the Supreme Court's legal counsel defended Alito, writing, "There is nothing to suggest that Justice Alito's actions violated ethical standards."

Opinions

Majority opinion

The Court issued its decision on June 24, 2022. In a 6–3 judgment, the Court reversed the Fifth Circuit's decision and remanded the case for further review. The majority opinion, joined by five of the justices, held that abortion was not a protected right under the Constitution, overturning both Roe and Casey, and returned the decision regarding abortion regulations back to the states. As a result, Dobbs is considered a landmark decision of the Court.

The majority decision was written by Justice Samuel Alito and joined by Justices Clarence Thomas, Neil Gorsuch, Brett Kavanaugh, and Amy Coney Barrett. The final majority decision was substantially similar to the leaked draft, with only minor changes in the original arguments and rebuttals to Justices Stephen Breyer's, Elena Kagan's, and Sonia Sotomayor's dissenting opinion and John Roberts's concurrence in judgment.

In the introductory statement, Alito, writing for the majority, summarized a constitutional historical view of abortion rights, saying, "The Constitution makes no reference to abortion, and no such right is implicitly protected by any constitutional provision." Alito based his argument on the criterion from Washington v. Glucksberg (1997) that a right must be "deeply rooted" in the nation's history.

Alito wrote, "abortion couldn't be constitutionally protected. Until the latter part of the 20th century, such a right was entirely unknown in American law. Indeed, when the Fourteenth Amendment was adopted, three quarters of the States made abortion a crime at all stages of pregnancy." He wrote, "Roe was egregiously wrong from the start. Its reasoning was exceptionally weak, and the decision has had damaging consequences. And far from bringing about a national settlement of the abortion issue, Roe and Casey have enflamed debate and deepened division."

After briefly describing the background of the case in Part I of the opinion, Alito argued in Part II that the right to an abortion was different from other privacy rights. He wrote, "What sharply distinguishes the abortion right from the rights recognized in the cases on which Roe and Casey rely is something that both those decisions acknowledged: Abortion destroys what those decisions call 'potential life' and what the law at issue in this case regards as the life of an 'unborn human being'." In addition to the language from the draft, Alito responded to the dissenting opinion, writing, "The dissent is very candid that it cannot show that a constitutional right to abortion has any foundation, let alone a 'deeply rooted' one, 'in this Nation's history and tradition'. The dissent does not identify any pre-Roe authority that supports such a right—no state constitutional provision or statute, no federal or state judicial precedent, not even a scholarly treatise."

In Part III, Alito discussed stare decisis. He also addressed the dissent's concern that Dobbs would extend to other rights, stating that the extent of the majority opinion on Dobbs applied only to abortion. In Part IV, Alito shrugged off the concern that the American people would lose respect for the Court. He wrote that the Court "cannot allow our decisions to be affected by any extraneous influences such as concern about the public's reaction to our work."

In Part V, Alito further responded to Roberts's concurrence in judgment seeking middle ground, claiming there are "serious problems with this approach" that would only prolong what he described as the turmoil of Roe. Alito argued that by only ruling that Mississippi's 15-week law is constitutional, the Court would have to later decide whether other states' laws with different deadlines for obtaining an abortion were constitutional. Since Roberts did not claim there was a constitutional right to an abortion, the Court rejected any constitutional grounds for upholding a "reasonable opportunity" to obtain an abortion and called Roberts's proposal unconstitutional. In Part VI, Alito wrote that because abortion is not a fundamental right, the lowest standard of review must apply to abortion laws, under which the laws must be sustained if they rationally relate to a legitimate state interest.

Concurrences
Thomas and Kavanaugh wrote separate concurrences. Thomas argued that the Court should go further in future cases, reconsidering other past Supreme Court cases that granted rights based on substantive due process, such as Griswold v. Connecticut (the right to contraception), Obergefell v. Hodges (the right to same-sex marriage), and Lawrence v. Texas (banned laws against private sexual acts). He wrote, "Because any substantive due process decision is 'demonstrably erroneous,' we have a duty to 'correct the error' established in those precedents."

Kavanaugh wrote separately, making multiple comments. He stated that it would still be unconstitutional to prohibit a woman from going to another state to seek an abortion under the right to travel, and that it would be unconstitutional to retroactively punish abortions performed before Dobbs when they had been protected by Roe and Casey.

Concurrence in judgment
Writing separately, Roberts concurred in the judgment. He believed the Court should reverse the Fifth Circuit's opinion on the Mississippi law and that "the viability line established by Roe and Casey should be discarded." Roberts did not agree with the majority's ruling to overturn Roe and Casey in their entirety, finding it "unnecessary to decide the case before us". He suggested a more narrow opinion to justify the constitutionality of Mississippi's law without addressing whether to overturn Roe and Casey. Roberts also wrote that abortion regulations should "extend far enough to ensure a reasonable opportunity to choose, but need not extend any further." He said that the Court should "leave for another day whether to reject any right to an abortion at all."

Dissent
Breyer, Kagan, and Sotomayor jointly wrote the dissent. In an introductory statement, the three wrote, "The right Roe and Casey recognized does not stand alone. To the contrary, the Court has linked it for decades to other settled freedoms involving bodily integrity, familial relationships, and procreation. Most obviously, the right to terminate a pregnancy arose straight out of the right to purchase and use contraception. In turn, those rights led, more recently, to rights of same-sex intimacy and marriage. Either the mass of the majority's opinion is hypocrisy, or additional constitutional rights are under threat. It is one or the other."

In Part I of their dissent, the three wrote, "The majority would allow States to ban abortion from conception onward because it does not think forced childbirth at all implicates a woman's rights to equality and freedom. Today's Court, that is, does not think there is anything of constitutional significance attached to a woman's control of her body and the path of her life. A State can force her to bring a pregnancy to term, even at the steepest personal and familial costs." They cited New York State Rifle & Pistol Association, Inc. v. Bruen ("Historical evidence that long predates [ratification] may not illuminate the scope of the right"), and wrote, "Had the pre-Roe liberalization of abortion laws occurred more quickly and more widely in the 20th century, the majority would say (once again) that only the ratifiers' views are germane." Addressing the majority's argument, based on Glucksberg, that a right must be "deeply rooted in the Nation's history", the dissenters reflected on what that approach would have meant for interracial marriage:

In response to Alito's claim that their "criteria, at a high level of generality, could license fundamental rights to illicit drug use, prostitution, and the like", they wrote, "that is flat wrong. The Court's precedents about bodily autonomy, sexual and familial relations, and procreation are all interwoven—all part of the fabric of our constitutional law, and because that is so, of our lives. Especially women's lives, where they safeguard a right to self-determination." In response to Kavanaugh's concurrence, they wrote, "His idea is that neutrality lies in giving the abortion issue to the States, where some can go one way and some another. But would he say that the Court is being 'scrupulously neutral' if it allowed New York and California to ban all the guns they want?" In Part II, the three discussed stare decisis. In Part III, they concluded, "With sorrow—for this Court, but more, for the many millions of American women who have today lost a fundamental constitutional protection—we dissent."

Impact

Pre-decision 
After the Dobbs litigation began, the Texas Heartbeat Act was enacted on September 1, 2021. Two lawsuits challenging the law, Whole Woman's Health v. Jackson and United States v. Texas, quickly propagated through the court systems and reached the Supreme Court. Oral arguments for both cases were on November 1, 2021, and decisions for both were issued in December 2021. The decisions primarily focused on standing rather than directly addressing constitutional matters and abortion-related issues; both allowed the Texas Heartbeat Act to remain in force while litigation continued in lower courts. Concern about the Supreme Court's considering three abortion-related cases in the 2021–22 term led to the near record number of amici curiae briefs filed for Dobbs before the case was argued on December 1, 2021.

Georgia had passed Georgia House Bill 481, best known as the Living Infants Fairness Equality (LIFE) Act, in 2019. The law banned most abortions after a fetal heartbeat was detected, about six weeks' time, with multiple exceptions: if the fetus were conceived by rape or incest, if the pregnancy were medically futile, or if the pregnancy threatened the mother's life. The law also revised who is considered a legal person, allowing pregnant women to receive child support and tax deductions for their offspring before birth. In October 2019, the LIFE Act was challenged, and in July 2020 the U.S. District Court for the Northern District of Georgia deemed it unconstitutional under Roe. Georgia appealed this ruling to the Eleventh Circuit, but because Dobbs was scheduled to be argued in December 2021, the Circuit Court issued a stay of review until after the Supreme Court decided Dobbs.

At least 22 states with Republican leadership either passed or were in the process of passing anti-abortion related bills when the Supreme Court agreed to hear Dobbs in May 2021. Enforcement of most of the new laws was enjoined by courts, but they became enforceable after Roe was overturned. Thirteen states have trigger laws that ban most abortions in the first and second trimesters if Roe is overturned. The states with trigger laws are Arkansas, Idaho, Kentucky, Louisiana, Mississippi, Missouri, North Dakota, Oklahoma, South Dakota, Tennessee, Texas, Utah, and Wyoming. Nine states, among them Alabama (which also passed the Human Life Protection Act in 2019), Arizona, Arkansas, Michigan, Mississippi, Oklahoma, Texas, West Virginia, and Wisconsin, never repealed their pre-Roe abortion bans, such as the Texas abortion statutes (1961). Those laws were not criminally enforceable due to Roe but are enforceable with Roe overturned. At least some Democratic attorneys general or candidates for attorneys general have pledged not to enforce anti-abortion laws and prevent or hinder local prosecutors' efforts to enforce them, whereas at least some Republicans have pledged to enforce new state bans.

Post-decision

State laws restricting abortion 
The overturning of Roe did not make abortion illegal nationwide. Abortion remains legal in most states, but those with trigger laws to restrict abortion with Roe and Casey overturned immediately did so. Multiple Republican governors and attorneys general moved to invoke their trigger laws to immediately ban abortion or call special sessions to implement abortion bans. In August 2022, Indiana became the first state to pass an abortion ban law after Dobbs.

Some states had older laws that restricted abortion but had been put on hold after Roe; after Dobbs, these states reviewed means to resume enforcement of the laws. Lawsuits challenging pre-Roe and newer laws were filed in multiple states; each argued that privacy provisions in the state's constitution provided abortion rights. In some states where such challenges were under way, injunctions against the laws restricting abortion were issued, including Louisiana and Utah on June 27, 2022. A lower state court placed an injunction on a 1928 pre-Roe ban in Texas on June 28; by July 1, the Texas Supreme Court reversed this order. Legal efforts to block a Wisconsin pre-Roe ban from being enforced were announced on June 28; by June 30, Michigan's state supreme court had yet to react to Governor Gretchen Whitmer's lawsuit alleging that the state's pre-Roe ban violated the state constitution. Abortion providers in Kentucky, Idaho, Mississippi, and Florida challenged newly passed abortion restrictions in those states; each suit alleged that the law violated provisions of the state's constitution. By June 30, judges had halted the enforcement of the laws in Kentucky and Florida.

An Ohio abortion law came under attention in July 2022. The law disallows abortions after embryonic cardiac activity is detectable (approximately six weeks into term), and makes no exceptions for rape or incest. The law passed in 2019 and had been blocked from enforcement by a court injunction, but with Dobbs, the injunction was lifted. A ten-year-old girl who had been raped traveled from Ohio to Indiana to have an abortion, as reported by the Indianapolis Star on July 1; her rapist was arrested by July 13. Before this arrest was made public, right-leaning politicians and media sources called the story a hoax; Ohio's attorney general Dave Yost said, "Every day that goes by, the more likely that this is a fabrication." After news of the arrest validated the Star story, these sources did not apologize for claiming the story was a hoax. Jim Bopp, the general counsel for the National Right to Life Committee, said in an interview that the girl should have been forced to bear the child, and that "She would have had the baby, and as many women who have had babies as a result of rape, we would hope that she would understand the reason and ultimately the benefit of having the child." Bopp's comment led to ire from several left-leaning politicians and media sources, deriding Dobbs and the stance taken by the right.

EMTALA and federal preemption 
Several states adopted, or began to enforce, laws that banned abortion without exceptions. But the U.S. Department of Health and Human Services (HHS) issued guidance after Dobbs stating that even in these states, abortions are still allowed if a physician determines that the pregnant woman's life is at risk, under the federal Emergency Medical Treatment and Active Labor Act (EMTALA), which requires hospitals receiving Medicare funding to provide emergency stabilizing medical treatment. As a federal law, EMTALA preempts inconsistent state law. The HHS guidance said: "If a physician believes that a pregnant patient presenting at an emergency department is experiencing an emergency medical condition as defined by EMTALA, and that abortion is the stabilizing treatment necessary to resolve that condition, the physician must provide that treatment. When a state law prohibits abortion and does not include an exception for the life of the pregnant person—or draws the exception more narrowly than EMTALA's emergency medical condition definition—that state law is preempted."

The U.S. Department of Justice sued Idaho, arguing that EMTALA preempts Idaho's law making it a criminal offense to perform any abortion, without exception. A district judge granted a preliminary injunction blocking Idaho's abortion ban "to the extent that [the ban] conflicts with EMTALA-mandated care."

Conversely, Texas responded to the HHS guidance by suing the Biden administration. In August 2022, a district judge in the Eastern District of Texas blocked HHS from applying the guidance. The White House criticized the ruling, and the Justice Department is appealing the ruling to the Fifth Circuit.

After Dobbs, the Department of Veterans Affairs continued its policy of offering abortion counseling to military veterans (as well as abortions to pregnant military veterans if the veteran's life is in danger and in cases of rape or incest), even in states where abortion is banned as a matter of state law. Beneficiaries of the VA's Civilian Health and Medical Program (CHAMPVA) are also entitled to the same services.

State laws expanding abortion access
In response to Dobbs, several states allowing abortion considered or adopted legislation expanding abortion access. Proposals by California, Oregon, and Washington state have included expanding abortion access by eliminating co-pays for abortion services, funding travel costs for those seeking abortion from states that ban abortion, and adding the right to an abortion to state constitutions. In early 2022, while Dobbs was pending, the Vermont Legislature had already approved sending Proposal 5 to the referendum ballot in November 2022, which would amend the state's constitution "to guarantee sexual and reproductive freedoms" (including the right to abortion). In the November 2022 election, Vermont voters overwhelmingly approved the reproductive-rights amendment to the state constitution. Also in the November 2022 election, abortion-rights referendums were passed by voters by broad margins in California (Proposition 1) and Michigan (Proposal 3).

In the hours after Dobbs was issued, Massachusetts Governor Charlie Baker issued an executive order with several measures to protect abortion access in Massachusetts. The Massachusetts Legislature subsequently passed a reproductive rights package that codified many of the provisions in the executive order, and was the outcome of compromise discussions among the legislature. Baker signed the bill, which passed the House 137-16 and the Senate 16–1. Among other things, the Massachusetts law strengthens an existing requirement that health insurers cover abortion services and shields Massachusetts patients and providers from penalties from states with more restrictive abortion laws; for example, it prohibits the state from extraditing to another state any person charged with offenses that would be legal under Massachusetts law, and protects abortion providers from lawsuits based on extraterritorial jurisdiction.

Congressional proposals
Following Dobbs, Congress has introduced bills related to abortion rights. House Democrats passed two bills on July 15 to enhance abortion rights. The first, the Women's Health Protection Act of 2022, would prevent states from restricting abortions before fetal viability and prevent states from blocking access to abortion services. The second, the Ensuring Access to Abortion Act of 2022, would prevent states from blocking travel to other states to obtain abortions and support. Both bills passed primarily on party lines, and are expected to have difficulty passing the Senate. Some House Republicans have proposed a nationwide 15-week abortion ban, while over 100 have signed onto a six-week abortion ban. Top House Republicans have been reported to be wary of such plans, instead favoring a nationwide ban on late-term abortions only.

Due to concerns based on Thomas's concurrence, in July 2022 the House passed bills aimed to protect rights that Thomas had mentioned, including the right to same-sex and interracial marriages via the Respect for Marriage Act, and access to contraceptives. The Senate passed the Respect for Marriage Act with amendments for exempting religious-based organizations, which the House passed in December and Biden signed into law on December 13, 2022.

Executive action by President Biden
After the decision, President Biden said there was a need to protect abortion rights, but said he would not support an executive order to mandate them or eliminating the Senate's filibuster to allow Democrats to pass federal abortion protections. Instead, on July 8, 2022, Biden issued Executive Order 14076, "Executive Order on Protecting Access to Reproductive Healthcare Services", which instructed the Department of Health and Human Services (HHS) to review and find ways to assure access to "the full range of reproductive health services", including "emergency contraception and long-acting reversible contraception like intrauterine devices (IUDs)", within the birth control coverage of the Affordable Care Act. The executive order also instructed HHS to evaluate ways to provide "technical assistance to states affording legal protection to out-of-state patients as well as providers who offer legal reproductive health care".

On August 3, 2022, Biden issued another executive order aimed at protecting women seeking abortions in other states.

Medical abortion and other processes
The Court's decision also sparked concern over access to medication abortion options, including the prescription of mifepristone and misoprostol. These medications have been approved for use by the United States Food and Drug Administration (FDA) within the first ten weeks of pregnancy. Secretary of Health and Human Services Xavier Becerra asserted that after the Dobbs decision, "We stand unwavering in our commitment to ensure every American has access to health care and the ability to make decisions about health care—including the right to safe and legal abortion, such as medication abortion that has been approved by the FDA for over 20 years."

Despite the federal stance, states opposed to abortion were considering laws to ban access to medical abortion, including out-of-state shipments in the U.S. mail and telemedicine support. Some states seeking to block medical abortion options are also considering censoring information about this option to residents, leading to potential First Amendment legal battles. Whether such state bans are legal under the Supremacy Clause, where federal law overrules conflicting state law, is unknown, as there is little case law to establish the strength of the FDA over state interests.

States that support abortion rights expected an influx of requests for medical abortion. Doctors and prescribers saw increased demand for contraception after both the leak and the ruling, including emergency and long-lasting after the latter. Some national pharmacy chains imposed limits on purchases. Other Americans have been denied refills of medical prescriptions for methotrexate, a form of chemotherapy taken long term for many autoimmune diseases, as it is considered an abortifacient.

Doctors throughout the U.S. reported an increase in requests for vasectomies. A Florida doctor said requests have doubled since the ruling with a prominent and continuous increase since June 24. Many of the men said they had previously considered a vasectomy but the ruling had been the tipping point.

Privacy rights 
Privacy rights related to data tracking through Internet usage, mobile phone usage, and mobile applications have been raised after the leak and subsequently after the decision. States with strict abortion laws could use this information to determine if women were seeking to have abortions. In addition to users taking steps to minimize their data footprint, groups like the Electronic Frontier Foundation urged companies that make these apps to take steps to reduce the amount of data they collect and use end-to-end encryption to further aid those seeking abortions outside of states that have banned them. House Speaker Nancy Pelosi said Democrats will introduce a bill to set certain requirements for reproductive health apps such as Flo. She said the legislation would aim to prevent data these apps collect from identifying women seeking abortions. Google announced it would delete location history data after users visit "medical facilities", including abortion clinics, counseling centers, and domestic violence shelters. The company also stated that it would introduce a way to mass-delete period data for Fitbit users.

2022 United States election season 
Dobbs made abortion rights a major issue in the November 2022 United States elections. Democrats, who generally support abortion rights, used the issue to try to offset the 2021–2022 inflation surge and Biden's lower approval rating when Dobbs was announced. Republicans, who were seeking to retake seats in both the House and Senate and gain several state governor and legislature positions but face tight races, had some concern that the negative reaction to Dobbs could work against them. They hoped that by November there will be more focus on the economy and other issues on which they expect to win. According to analyst firm AdImpact, by September 2022, Democrats had spent  on political advertising that highlighted abortion rights, while Republicans had spent only  on abortion-related ads, instead focusing on other issues.

At least six states had an abortion-related ballot initiative in response to Dobbs, the most ever in a single year. The first test came with Kansas's referendum on August 2, 2022. The state's Value Them Both constitutional amendment was approved for public vote about a year before Dobbs was decided. It would have removed Kansas's constitutional protections for abortion, allowing the legislature to enact more restrictions on the procedure. In the wake of Dobbs, voter registration in Kansas surged, particularly among Democratic and female voters. Almost 60% of voters voted against the amendment.

The backlash to the decision resulted in a boost in polling and performance for Democrats in special congressional races. According to election analysis site FiveThirtyEight, by August 2022 the impact of Dobbs led to an unusual swing in favor of Democrats ahead of the general election by nine points. The results of the midterm elections showed a significant impact of Dobbs, with voters supporting abortion rights helping Democrats retain control of the Senate as well as to support state-level changes to support abortion rights in five states.

Legal analysis 
Alito's final opinion mirrored points made in the leaked draft, evaluating abortion from a historical standpoint and arguing that the Fourteenth Amendment covers only those rights that were "deeply rooted" at the time of its ratification in 1868, which did not include abortion. He referenced common law as far back as 17th-century English law, which had established that abortion was illegal after quickening, the point when fetal movements are detectable, about 16 to 22 weeks of gestation. Alito subsequently pointed to a wave of laws introduced in the U.S. in the 19th century that outlawed pre-quickening abortions, and claimed "abortion couldn't be constitutionally protected. Until the latter part of the 20th century, such a right was entirely unknown in American law. When the Fourteenth Amendment was adopted, three quarters of the States made abortion a crime at all stages of pregnancy." Some historians say that Alito's view skews the history of abortion in the U.S. and creates a flawed basis for overturning Roe. Patricia Cline Cohen, a professor emeritus at the University of California, Santa Barbara, said that these laws had come about not because society saw abortion as a crime, but from a small group of white male doctors from Boston who had taken it upon themselves to prove to the rest of the county that pre-quickening abortion should be seen as a crime. The doctors used flawed math to convince the American Medical Association to accept that pre-quickening abortion should also be outlawed, leading to the raft of state laws banning abortion in the latter half of the 19th century.

Many legal observers have said the ruling creates an independent legal framework, as it lays out a state's ability to determine independent abortion laws. As many states have rulings prosecuting abortions, even out of state, some have argued that this produces a legal framework in which a U.S. state can act more like a sovereign country, prosecuting individuals from taking actions outside the state's legal jurisdiction. The enforceability and practicality of such a decision has been criticized. The ruling has been seen in the context of ever-increasing partisanship and political division in the country.

The decision raised concerns about similar rights recognized by the Court that are not enumerated in the Constitution according to originalism. According to Thomas's concurrence, the rights to contraceptives and to same-sex marriage could be challenged based on Dobbs, since they were not recognized during the 19th century either. Some legal experts cautioned that Alito's and Thomas's interpretation of the Constitution could harm women, minorities, and other marginalized groups. University of Colorado Boulder Associate Professor of Law Scott Skinner-Thompson said, "The Court has for a long, long time said: Look, if we define liberty only in terms of what was permitted at the time of ratification of the Bill of Rights or the 14th Amendment, then we’re stuck in time. Because in the 18th and 19th centuries, this country was not very free for many, many people—particularly women, particularly people of color." Further, Roe itself was built on the legal reasoning of the two cases that assured contraceptive availability, Griswold v. Connecticut and Eisenstadt v. Baird, which held that the Fourteenth Amendment establishes a "zone of personal privacy and autonomy" with which the states cannot interfere, according to Emily Berman, an associate professor at the University of Houston. Berman said that the way Alito had rationalized overturning Roe could lead to challenges to both Griswold and Eisenstadt based on the apparent lack of explicit Fourteenth Amendment coverage. Alabama used the Dobbs rationale of deeply rooted rights to argue for lifting a federal injunction placed in May 2022 on its law that would ban sex reassignment therapy for minors that was to go into effect in 2023.

Adam Liptak of The New York Times commented on the frequent mention of Brown v. Board of Education, the Supreme Court case that overturned Plessy v. Ferguson and required desegregation of public schools. Liptak said that Alito had argued for overturning Roe and Casey in the same manner that Brown argued for overturning Plessy. Liptak said the dissents in Dobbs stated that the decision was "the majority's method of constitutional construction" in originalism, and that the Court "might not ever have overruled Plessy, whether five or 50 or 500 years later" if originalism had been applied to Brown.

Some commentators criticized the idea that abortion was not "deeply rooted" in American "history and tradition". Nancy Gertner and John Reinstein pointed out that in earlier centuries, American society was deeply sexist and excluded women from politics, banning contraception to ensure "that women performed their duties as wives and mothers". Molly Farrell argued that abortion techniques were widely known and practiced in colonial America, if poorly documented because illiterate women acted as midwives. She pointed out Benjamin Franklin, one of the Founding Fathers of the United States, added a how-to section on abortion in a book intended to convey the most basic knowledge all Americans needed.

Reaction

Supreme Court 
Alito gave his first public comments on the ruling in a keynote address largely about religious liberty for Notre Dame Law School's Religious Liberty Initiative in Rome. He mocked several foreign leaders for criticizing the decision, particularly U.K. Prime Minister Boris Johnson, whose pending resignation Alito referenced; and Prince Harry, Duke of Sussex, who had compared the decision to the 2022 Russian invasion of Ukraine.

Political

Support 
Those aligned with the United States anti-abortion movement celebrated Dobbs, including the National Right to Life Committee, other anti-abortion activists, Republican Senate Minority Leader Mitch McConnell, and many other congressional Republicans. After former president Barack Obama criticized the Court for overruling the longstanding precedent of Roe v. Wade, Senator John Cornyn tweeted, "Now do Plessy vs Ferguson/Brown vs Board of Education", alluding to the fact that the latter Supreme Court decision had largely overruled the former, a then-58-year-old precedent that racial segregation was constitutional.

In a statement, former president Donald Trump took credit for the decision and called it "the biggest WIN for LIFE in a generation", although in private Trump was allegedly more ambivalent about overturning Roe, speculating that it might be "bad for Republicans" by leading to backlash among suburban female voters in the upcoming midterm elections. In the aftermath of the contest, he publicly blamed anti-abortion extremism for the underperformance of Republican candidates. Former vice president Mike Pence also applauded the decision, saying that "life won", and called for a national ban on abortion.

Republican Florida Governor Ron DeSantis said, "By properly interpreting the Constitution, the Supreme Court has answered the prayers of millions upon millions of Americans," adding that he would work to further restrict abortion in Florida. A new law in Florida, currently under review by state courts, would restrict abortions to 15 weeks of pregnancy, without providing exceptions for rape or incest. Republican Florida Senate President Wilton Simpson, who was adopted as a child, argued the Court's decision would promote adoption as an alternative to abortion. Simpson said, "Florida is a state that values life."

Opposition 

Conversely, those aligned with the United States abortion-rights movement opposed the decision, including President Joe Biden, who said, "It's a sad day for the Court and for the country ... the health and life of women in this nation are now at risk"; former president Barack Obama, who called it an "attack" on "the essential freedoms of millions of Americans"; U.S. Attorney General Merrick Garland, who warned states not to forbid women to seek abortions beyond their borders; U.S. Secretary of Health and Human Services Xavier Becerra, who called the decision "unconscionable" and said that abortion is an essential part of healthcare; Senator Elizabeth Warren, who called for increasing the number of justices on the court; and many other congressional Democrats.

Senator Susan Collins, a Republican who supports abortion rights and voted in the Senate to confirm Kavanaugh, said she felt "misled" by Kavanaugh, who, she claimed, said in a private meeting with her that he would respect precedent, assuring her that he is "a don't-rock-the-boat kind of judge". Democratic Senator Joe Manchin, who crossed party lines and voted to confirm both Kavanaugh and Gorsuch, made similar comments, saying, "I trusted Justice Gorsuch and Justice Kavanaugh when they testified under oath that they also believed Roe v. Wade was settled legal precedent and I am alarmed they chose to reject the stability the ruling has provided for two generations of Americans." Massachusetts Governor Charlie Baker, a Republican, expressed disappointment in the decision and signed an executive order protecting abortion rights in the state. Governors Jay Inslee, Kate Brown, and Gavin Newsom of Washington, Oregon, and California, respectively, announced a formation of the "West Coast offense", a joint policy to allow and protect abortion rights.

Representative Alexandria Ocasio-Cortez called Dobbs and other recent decisions some deemed favorable to conservatives—including Oklahoma v. Castro-Huerta, which weakened tribal oversight of Native American lands; New York State Rifle & Pistol Association, Inc. v. Bruen, which expanded the right for open carry of guns; Kennedy v. Bremerton School District, which drew back the separation of church and state in the Establishment Clause; and West Virginia v. EPA, which weakened the power of federal agencies—a "judicial coup", demanding that President Joe Biden and Congress act to curtail the Supreme Court's power.

Religious 
The decision was seen as a victory for the Christian right in American politics. The president of the anti-abortion group Operation Rescue, Troy Newman, called the decision a "human rights victory". Support was widespread among leaders of the Catholic Church, including Pope Francis, who compared abortion to "hiring a hit man"; the United States Conference of Catholic Bishops; Archbishops José Horacio Gómez and William E. Lori; and many other bishops. President Bart Barber and other officials of the Southern Baptist Convention, and the Life Ministry of the Lutheran Church—Missouri Synod, celebrated the decision.

Mainline Protestant leaders were generally critical of the decision, including Bishop Elizabeth Eaton of the Evangelical Lutheran Church in America, the General Ministers of United Church of Christ, and Presiding Bishop Michael Curry of the Episcopal Church.

Many American Jewish organizations, including the National Council of Jewish Women, Hadassah, American Jewish Committee, the Anti-Defamation League, Hillel International, the Rabbinical Assembly, and the Women's Rabbinic Network, opposed the decision. They cited support for legal abortion and religious freedom, disagreeing with the court's opinion and "conservative Christian theology" on the beginning of human personhood. The Haredi Orthodox Jewish organization Agudath Israel of America, though, "welcome[d]" the end of Roe v. Wade.

American Muslims' reactions were varied, as views on abortion differ within Islam. Many said Dobbs curtailed religious freedom, reflected only Christian right views, and damaged cultural and religious pluralism.

Civil rights 
Multiple civil and reproductive rights groups, including the NAACP, criticized the decision. The Congressional Black Caucus called for the declaration of a national emergency. Liberals argued that the ruling and Thomas's concurrence created the potential to jeopardize other civil rights. Laurence H. Tribe, a constitutional scholar and a professor at Harvard Law School, called it not only "reactionary" and "unprincipled" but also damaging to the Ninth Amendment to the United States Constitution. Linda Coffee, a leading attorney for Norma McCorvey in Roe v. Wade, said the Supreme Court's decision to overturn it "flies in the face of American freedom" and "destroys dignity of all American women". Jim Obergefell, the lead plaintiff in the Supreme Court case Obergefell v. Hodges that ruled same-sex marriage bans unconstitutional, criticized Thomas, whose own interracial marriage required Loving v. Virginia in order to be recognized by all states, for urging the Court to revisit and overrule its prior decisions.

Health and education 
The president and CEO of the Association of American Medical Colleges, David J. Skorton, released a statement that said the decision "will significantly limit access for so many and increase health inequities across the country, ultimately putting women's lives at risk, at the very time that we should be redoubling our commitment to patient-centered, evidence-based care that promotes better health for all individuals and communities." The statement further affirmed the association's commitment to providing abortion access, saying that it "will continue working with our medical schools and teaching hospitals to ensure that physicians are able to provide all patients with safe, effective, and accessible health care when they need it." The president of the American Academy of Pediatrics, Moria Szilagyi, released a statement that the organization reaffirmed the policy to support "adolescents' right to access comprehensive, evidence-based reproductive healthcare services", including abortion. She added that the decision threatened adolescents' health and safety and jeopardized the patient-physician relationship.

Academics from the University of Minnesota School of Public Health and the University of Colorado Boulder criticized the decision, saying that as there is going to be an increase in pregnancies, there will be an increase in maternal and infant deaths. In 2020, there were 23.8 deaths from pregnancy or childbirth-related causes for every 100,000 births, the highest maternal mortality rate of any developed country, with black mothers 2.9 times more likely to die than white mothers.

A study published in JAMA Internal Medicine found that demand for abortion medications in the United States, as reflected by internet search trends, reached record highs nationally after the draft Dobbs opinion was leaked online. Public health activists have begun exploring ways to make medical abortion more available, particularly in states where it is subject to limitations, using social media for this purpose.

International 

The United Nations High Commissioner for Human Rights, Michelle Bachelet, said that the decision "represents a major setback after five decades of protection for sexual and reproductive health and rights". The Director-General of the World Health Organization, Tedros Adhanom Ghebreyesus, said, "I am very disappointed, because women's rights must be protected. And I would have expected America to protect such rights."

Western world foreign leaders generally condemned the decision. Canadian Prime Minister Justin Trudeau called the decision "horrific", while pledging, "[I]n Canada, we will always defend the woman's right to choose." British Prime Minister Boris Johnson called the decision "a big step backwards", while reassuring that there were laws "throughout the UK" for a "woman's right to choose". Scottish First Minister Nicola Sturgeon tweeted after the ruling that this was "[o]ne of the darkest days for women’s rights" in her lifetime. Belgian Prime Minister Alexander De Croo said that he was "very concerned about implications of U.S. Supreme Court decision" and "the signal it sends to the world". French President Emmanuel Macron said that "abortion is a fundamental right for all women. It must be protected." He expressed his "solidarity" with U.S. women. Danish Prime Minister Mette Frederiksen called the decision "a huge setback" and said that her "heart cries for girls and women in the United States". New Zealand Prime Minister Jacinda Ardern called the decision "incredibly upsetting" and "a loss for women everywhere". Greek Prime Minister Kyriakos Mitsotakis said he was "really troubled" by the decision, saying it is "a major step back in the fight for women's rights". Spanish Prime Minister Pedro Sánchez said that "we cannot take any right for granted" and that "women must be able to decide freely about their lives".

The President of the Vatican's Pontifical Academy for Life, Archbishop Vincenzo Paglia, called the ruling "a powerful invitation to reflect together on the serious and urgent issue of human generativity and the conditions that make it possible". Members of some European far-right parties, notably Beatrix von Storch of Alternative for Germany, approved of the decision. Brazilian president Jair Bolsonaro indirectly signaled his approval, tweeting, "May God continue to give strength and wisdom to those who protect the innocence and future of our children, in Brazil and around the world," the day the decision was released, one day after he had criticized abortion.

In July 2022, the European Parliament voted 324–155, with 38 abstentions, to condemn the ruling.

News 
The editorial boards of many news outlets opposed the ruling, including The New York Times, The Washington Post, Los Angeles Times, Chicago Tribune, The Boston Globe, Newsday, Houston Chronicle, Miami Herald, Detroit Free Press, Star Tribune, and The Denver Post.

The ruling was supported by the senior editorial staff of National Review, and the editorial boards of The Wall Street Journal, The Washington Times, and the New York Post.

Readership of women-centric news publications increased during the aftermath of the ruling.

Public 

The decision was divisive among the American public. Around 55–60% of respondents expressed disapproval when asked if they believed Roe should be overturned. But polls conducted before the ruling also showed that only around 29% of Americans believe abortion should generally be legal until fetal viability (24 weeks), the threshold set by Planned Parenthood v. Casey. A June 2022 Harvard/Harris poll found that 44% of Americans believe that state legislatures should set abortion standards, while 25% believe the Supreme Court should, and 31% believe Congress should; a June 2022 CBS/YouGov poll found that 58% of Americans support federal legislation to protect abortion rights nationwide. A May 2022 Gallup poll showed that 67% of Americans support legal abortion in the first trimester of pregnancy, 36% support legal abortion in the second trimester, and 20% support legal abortion in the third trimester. Public support for abortion rights increased after the decision, with an August 2022 Wall Street Journal poll finding that 60% of Americans supported access to abortion to in most or all circumstances, up from 55% in a poll conducted in March. The same August poll also found that bans after six or 15 weeks of pregnancy (with the exception of cases where the mothers' health was threatened) were unpopular, with 62% and 57% of Americans opposed, respectively.

Large numbers of protesters gathered at the Supreme Court building after the decision's announcement. Clashes between police and protesters, resulting in tear gassing and arrests, occurred in Los Angeles, New York City, and Phoenix. Protests also took place in Chicago, along with solidarity protests in Berlin, London, and Toronto, and were planned to take place throughout the U.S. over the days after the decision. The DHS issued a memo to law enforcement agencies and first responders to be aware of potential extremist violence in the weeks following the decision, particularly at federal and state government offices, abortion clinics and other health providers, and at faith-based organizations.

The decision sparked at least one incident of trespassing into a state legislature by abortion-rights activists. Protesters breached a security barrier at the Arizona State Capitol and attempted to enter the building while the legislature was in session. The proceedings were temporarily halted as lawmakers were forced into the building's basement after tear gas was fired into the crowd.

Some politicians and academics questioned the Supreme Court's legitimacy in the wake of the leak and official ruling in Dobbs. A June 2022 Harvard/Harris poll showed that 63% of Americans consider the Supreme Court legitimate and 59% believe it is wrong to call it illegitimate. NBC News had run polls on the public opinion of the Supreme Court since 1992, with majority opinion wavering between neutral and positive through May 2022. Its August 2022 poll, after Dobbs, had the majority with a negative opinion of the Court. Compared to only 17% of respondents with little to no confidence in the Court in June 2019, the number had increased to 37% by August 2022.

A 2023 Public Religion Research Institute poll found that a majority in every state opposed the overturn of Roe v. Wade.

Corporate and celebrity 
Most corporations remained silent about the ruling, even ones that had been outspoken on social issues in the past. But some, including Amazon, Comcast, Dell, Disney, eBay, Goldman Sachs, JPMorgan Chase, Levi Strauss & Co., Meta, Netflix, Paramount, Snap, Sony, Tesla, and Yelp, said they would cover travel benefits for employees seeking abortions in states that protected abortion access.

Several technology executives and celebrities have condemned the ruling. The NBA and WNBA released a joint statement supporting the right to abortion. The National Women's Soccer League Players Association also condemned the ruling.

See also 

 Abortion law
 List of United States Supreme Court leaks

Footnotes

References 
Inline

General
 
 
 
 
 
 
 {{cite journal |last = Ziegler |first = Mary |date = 2013 |title = ''Roes Race: The Supreme Court, Population Control, and Reproductive Justice |url = https://openyls.law.yale.edu/bitstream/handle/20.500.13051/7052/04_25YaleJL_Feminism1_2013_2014_.pdf |journal = Yale Journal of Law and Feminism |volume = 25 |issue = 1 |pages = |doi = }}

 Further reading 
 
 
 

 External links Written opinions Texts of the two state laws 
 Oral arguments'''
 
 

2022 in United States case law
History of women in Mississippi
History of women's rights in the United States
Medical lawsuits
Right to abortion under the United States Constitution
Right to privacy under the United States Constitution
United States abortion case law
United States privacy case law
United States Supreme Court cases
United States Supreme Court cases of the Roberts Court
United States Supreme Court decisions that overrule a prior Supreme Court decision
Anti-abortion movement in the United States
Articles containing video clips